1999 Japanese Super Cup was the Japanese Super Cup competition. The match was played at National Stadium in Tokyo on February 27, 1999. Kashima Antlers won the championship.

Match details

References

1999
1999 in Japanese football
Kashima Antlers matches
Shimizu S-Pulse matches